Cigera is a hamlet in Didohu district, Pegunungan Arfak Regency in West Papua province, Indonesia. Its population is 82.

Climate
Cigera has a subtropical highland climate (Cfb) with heavy rainfall year-round.

References

 Populated places in West Papua